Phenelfamycin E is an elfamycin-type antibiotic with the molecular formula C65H95ON21. Phenelfamycin E is only used for research Phenelfamycin E is produced by Streptomyces bacteria.

References 

Antibiotics
Tetrasaccharides
Amides
Tetrahydropyrans
Pyrrolidines
Methoxy compounds
Carboxylic acids
Phenyl alkanoic acids